The Geological Museum is a museum in Ipoh, Kinta District, Perak, Malaysia.

History
The construction of the museum started in July 1955 when the groundbreaking ceremony was officiated by Perak Crown Prince Idris Shah II of Perak. The museum was finished and opened in 1957. The museum was extensively renovated and upgraded to increase the exhibition space and collections under the Ninth Malaysia Plan.

Architecture
The museum occupies an area of 343 m2. The building forms an integral part with the Minerals and Geoscience Department Complex of Ipoh.

Exhibitions
The museum is divided into seven zones, ranging from the history of the museum and department, history of earth, dinosaur, minerals, mining activities, mineral exploration, geological hazards etc. It displays more than 600 types of minerals and various stones.

See also
 List of museums in Malaysia
 List of tourist attractions in Perak
 Geography of Malaysia

References

1957 establishments in Malaya
Buildings and structures in Ipoh
Geology museums
Museums established in 1957
Museums in Perak